Cutter may refer to:

Tools 

 Bolt cutter
 Box cutter, aka Stanley knife, a form of utility knife
 Cigar cutter
 Cookie cutter
 Glass cutter
 Meat cutter
 Milling cutter
 Paper cutter
 Side cutter
 Cutter, a type of hydraulic rescue tool

People
 Cutter (surname)

Fictional characters
 Cutter, a character from the 1998 animated film Antz
 Cutter, a character from the comic book property Elfquest
 Cutter (G.I. Joe), a character from the G.I. Joe toyline, comic books, and animated series
 Cutter John, a character from the comic strip Bloom County
 Cutter Wentworth, a character from the television soap opera One Life to Live
 John Cutter, a character from the 1992 film Passenger 57
 Nick Cutter, a character from the television series Primeval
 Sol Cutter, a character from the video game Burn Cycle
 Captain Spaulding (nicknamed "Cutter"), a character appearing in films by Rob Zombie

Companies
 Cutter Consortium, an information technology research firm
 Cutter Laboratories, a pharmaceutical company

Entertainment
 The Cutter, a 2005 American action film directed by William Tannen
 Cutters (TV series), an American television series
 Cutter (professional wrestling), a move in professional wrestling involving a facelock and a bulldog, also known as an RKO
 The Cutter (album), a compilation album of Echo & the Bunnymen 
 "The Cutter" (song), a 1983 single by Echo & the Bunnymen

Sport and games
 Cutter or cut fastball, a type of pitch in baseball
 Cutter (card player), the player who cuts the pack in a card game
 Leg cutter, a type of delivery in cricket
 Off cutter, a type of delivery in cricket
 Cutter, a participant in the equestrian sport of cutting, where the horse and rider demonstrate their ability to handle cattle
 Cutters, a current Little 500 cycling team whose name was taken from 1979 film Breaking Away

Transportation
 Cutter (boat), a term applied to several different sorts of watercraft defined by hull type, sailing rig, or the intended use
 United States Coast Guard Cutter, a term used by the United States Coast Guard for its commissioned vessels
 UKBF 42m Customs Cutter, a class of four patrol vessel for the UK Border Force
 Cutter, a type of small horse-drawn sled

Other uses
 Coors Cutter, a beverage
 Cutter v. Wilkinson, a 2005 U.S. Supreme Court case
 Cutter Expansive Classification, a library classification system
 Someone who engages in self-harm

See also
 Cut (disambiguation)
 Cutting (disambiguation)
 Qatar
 Cutter & Buck
 Kutter (disambiguation)
 Woodcutter (disambiguation)